Voice From Home is the ninth album from FFH. It was released on December 12, 2005.

Track listing 
 "The Only Hand You Need" (Jeromy Deibler) - 5:20
 "Great Big Problem" (Jeromy Deibler, Mark Vogel) - 4:25
 "Well Pleased" (Jeromy Deibler) - 3:56
 "Can't Let Go" (Michael Boggs) - 3:47
 "I Am Love" (Jeromy Deibler, Mark Vogel) - 5:00
 "Worth It All" (Jeromy Deibler) - 4:54
 "It's You" (Michael Boggs, Belinda Smith) - 3:25
 "Through My Eyes" (Jeromy Deibler, Mark Vogel) - 5:07
 "Grand Canyon" (Jeromy Deibler, Mark Vogel) - 4:29
 "Take a Chance" (Michael Boggs) - 4:24
 "Come Away" (Jeromy Deibler, Mark Vogel) - 5:26
 "Listen" (Jeromy Deibler) - 3:38

Personnel 
FFH
 Michael Boggs
 Jennifer Deibler 
 Jeromy Deibler 
 Brian Smith 

Additional musicians
 Mark Vogel – acoustic piano (8, 11)
 Matt Shockley – electric guitar (3)
 Kevin Perry – electric guitar (8)
 Tommy Magee – bass (8)
 Brian Barefoot – drums, percussion

Production 
 Jeromy Deibler – producer 
 Robert Beeson – executive producer 
 Conor Farley – executive producer 
 Michael Modesto – engineer, mixing 
 Harry Shaub – additional engineer, assistant engineer 
 Christopher Biggs – mixing 
 Barry Weeks – mixing, mastering 
 Heather Hetzler – A&R production 
 Stephanie McBrayer – art direction 
 Tim Parker – art direction
 Robert Ascroft – photography 
 Brady Wardlaw – hair stylist, make-up 
 Morey Management – management 

2005 albums
FFH (band) albums
Essential Records (Christian) albums